German submarine U-213 was a Type VIID mine-laying U-boat of Nazi Germany's Kriegsmarine during World War II.

Training
Laid down on 1 October 1940 by Friedrich Krupp Germaniawerft in Kiel as yard number 645, the boat was launched on 24 July 1941 and commissioned on 30 August with Oberleutnant zur See Amelung von Varendorff in command. She trained with the 5th U-boat Flotilla until 31 December 1941; on 1 January 1942 she was assigned to the 1st U-boat Flotilla. On 1 May 1942 she was assigned to the 9th U-boat Flotilla and spent the rest of her career with that unit.

Design
As one of the six German Type VIID submarines, U-213 had a displacement of  when at the surface and  while submerged. She had two shafts and two  propellers.

U-213 was fitted with five  torpedo tubes (four fitted at the bow and one at the stern), twelve torpedoes, one  SK C/35 naval gun, 220 rounds, and an anti-aircraft gun, in addition to five mine tubes with fifteen SMA mines. The boat had a complement of between forty-four.

Service history

U-213 carried out three war patrols during her career, ranging into the North Atlantic. One of them included the landing of an Abwehr agent, Alfred Langbein, on the Canadian coast near St. Martins, New Brunswick on 14 May 1942. The mission was termed Operation Grete; Langbein was instructed to report on the sailing of convoys. He failed to accomplish this, and surrendered to the authorities in September 1944 after running out of money. He was released after the end of the war. U-213 was a member of three "wolfpacks" during the war, as part of 'Schlei' from 1 February until 12 February 1942, 'Westwall' from the 2 to 12 March, and 'Pfadfinder' from the 2 to 27 May.

During this period she suffered two attacks, one on 7 February 1942 from the escorts of convoy ON-63, which she was attempting to attack, which left the U-boat slightly damaged after attacks by depth charges; another was when the boat was surprised on the surface by a destroyer in bad weather in the Gulf of Maine, and was again slightly damaged by depth charges on 15 May.

Wolfpacks
U-213 took part in three wolfpacks:
  (1–12 February 1942)
  (2–12 March 1942)
  (21–27 May 1942)

References

Bibliography

Further reading

External links
 
 

German Type VIID submarines
U-boats commissioned in 1941
U-boats sunk in 1942
World War II shipwrecks in the Atlantic Ocean
World War II submarines of Germany
1941 ships
Ships built in Kiel
U-boats sunk by British warships
U-boats sunk by depth charges
Ships lost with all hands
Maritime incidents in July 1942